Rhodine is a genus of capitellid segmented worms in the family Maldanidae.

Morphology
Rhodine worms have a head with a transverse ridge on the posterior part of their peristomium; their neurochaetae begin on the fifth chaetiger (i.e. any segment with chaetae); they present double rows of uncini in median and posterior chaetigers; they have an indeterminate number of chaetigers; and their posterior segments have posteriorly directed collars.

References

External links

Annelid genera
Polychaete genera